Kasap may refer to:
Buloh Kasap Bridge
Buloh Kasap
Kasap Dasht Kuh
Kasap (surname)